= Alyko Beach =

Alyko Beach Παραλία Άλυκο
- Beach
- Location in Greece
- Coordinates: 36.9785°N 25.3908°E
- Country: Greece
- Time zone: UTC+2 (EET)
  - Summer (DST): UTC+3 (EEST)

Alyko Beach is a coastal area located on the southwestern coast of Naxos, Greece. It is part of a series of beaches surrounded by sand dunes, cedar forests, and clear waters. The area is known for its natural and undeveloped state.

== Landscape ==
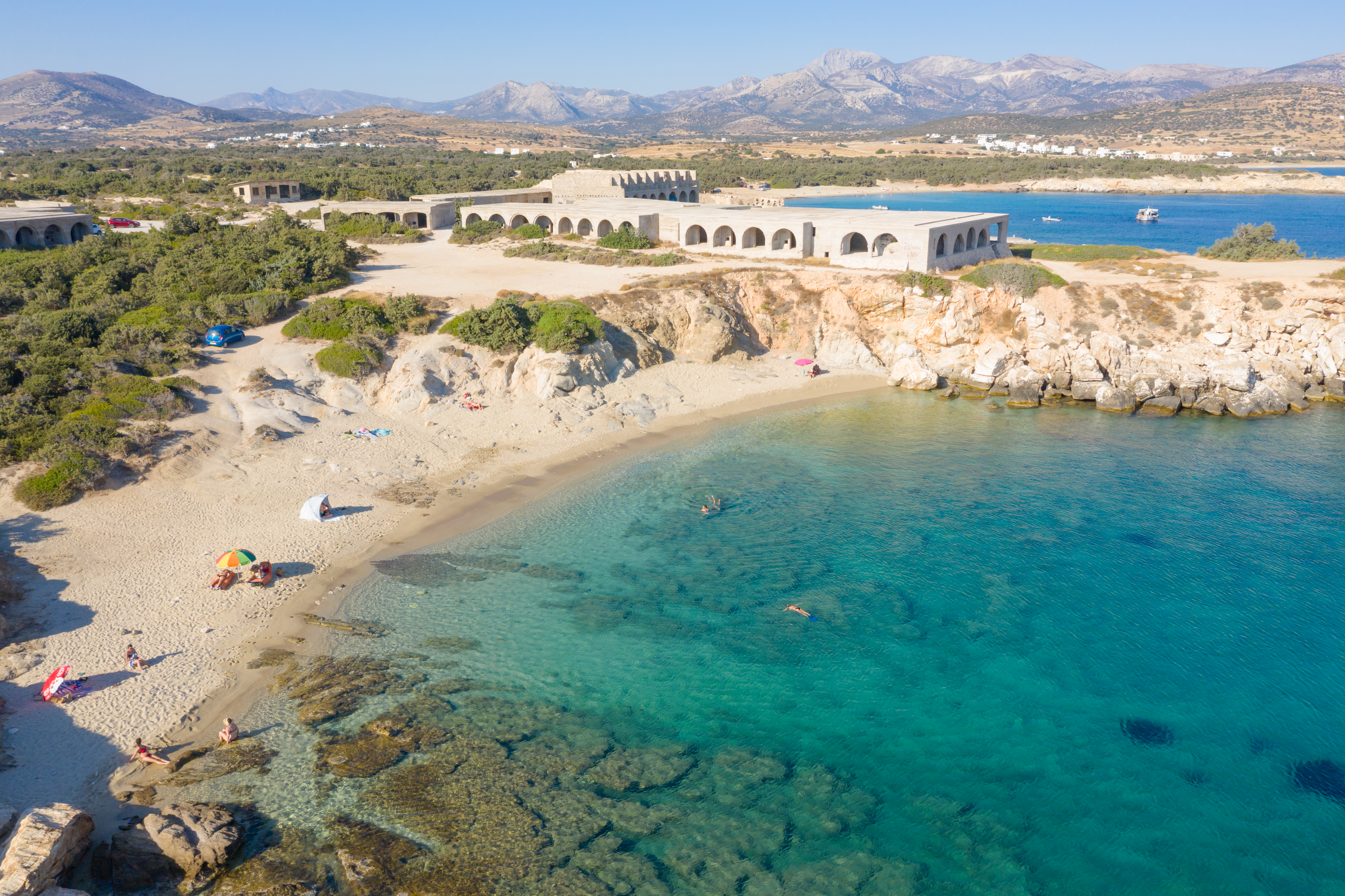
Aerial view of Mikro Alyko Beach

The cliffs and sandy shores of Alyko Beach form several small bays, surrounded by a hectare of protected cedar forest. This rare forest adds to the area's ecological importance and makes it stand out among the Greek islands. The shallow waters near the shore gradually lead to deeper areas, perfect for swimming and snorkeling.

== Activities ==
- Snorkeling and Swimming: The waters are suitable for snorkeling and swimming.
- Hiking: Trails near the cedar forest offer opportunities for hiking and enjoying views of the coastline.
- Art Exploration: The graffiti-covered ruins near the beach provide a site for exploration.

== Accessibility ==
Alyko Beach is about 17 kilometers from Naxos Town (Chora) and can be reached by car or taxi, though public transport options are limited.
